Town of Saugeen Shores (Population centres: Port Elgin, Southampton)
 Municipality of Kincardine (Population centre: Kincardine)
 Municipality of Brockton (Population centre: Walkerton)
 Town of South Bruce Peninsula (Population centre: Wiarton)
 Municipality of Arran–Elderslie
 Township of Huron-Kinloss (Population centre: Lucknow)
 Municipality of South Bruce
 Municipality of Northern Bruce Peninsula
Also within the Bruce census division are two First Nations reserves:
 Neyaashiinigmiing
 Saugeen 29

Historic townships 
 Albemarle (Hope Bay, McIver, Colpoy's Bay, Mar, Red Bay) now in South Bruce Peninsula
 Amabel (Wiarton, Oliphant, Sauble Falls, Sauble Beach, Skipness, Park Head, Allenford) now in South Bruce Peninsula
 Arran (Elsinore, Tara, Invermay, Burgoyne) now in Arran-Elderslie
 Brant (Walkerton, Maple Hill, Dunkeld, Eden Grove, Vesta, Elmwood) now in Brockton
 Bruce (Tiverton, Underwood, Inverhuron) now in the Municipality of Kincardine
 Carrick (Formosa, Ambleside, Mildmay, Deemerton, Carlsruhe) now in South Bruce
 Culross (Teeswater) now in South Bruce
 Eastnor (Spry, Lion's Head, Hopeness, Pike Bay) now in Northern Bruce Peninsula
 Elderslie (Paisley, Chesley) now in Arran-Elderslie
 Greenock (Riversdale, Greenock, Chepstow, Cargill, Pinkerton, Bradley, Lovat) now in Brockton
 Huron (Pine River, Purple Grove, Verdun, Ripley) now in Huron-Kinloss
 Kincardine (Kincardine, Inverhuron, Millarton, Bervie, Armow) now in the Municipality of Kincardine
 Kinloss (Kinloss, Kinlough, Holyrood, Langside, Lucknow) now in Huron-Kinloss
 Lindsay (Cape Chin, Dyer's Bay, Stokes Bay) now in Northern Bruce Peninsula
 Saugeen (Southampton, Port Elgin) now the Town of Saugeen Shores
 St. Edmund's (Tobermory) now in Northern Bruce Peninsula